Kamenac is a settlement in the region of Baranja, Croatia. Administratively, it is located in the Kneževi Vinogradi municipality within the Osijek-Baranja County. Population is 177 people.

Ethnic groups (2001 census)
Croats = 98
Hungarians = 74
Serbs = 5

See also
Osijek-Baranja county
Baranja

References 

Kneževi Vinogradi